The 1998 All-Ireland Minor Football Championship was the 67th staging of the All-Ireland Minor Football Championship, the Gaelic Athletic Association's premier inter-county Gaelic football tournament for boys under the age of 18.

Laois entered the championship as defending champions in search of a third successive All-Ireland title.

On 27 September 1998, Tyrone won the championship following a 2-11 to 0-11 defeat of Laois in the All-Ireland final. This was their fourth All-Ireland title overall and their first in 25 championship seasons.

Results

Connacht Minor Football Championship

Quarter-finals

Semi-finals

Final

Leinster Minor Football Championship

Preliminary round

Quarter-finals

Semi-finals

Final

Munster Minor Football Championship

Rob robin

Semi-finals

Final

Ulster Minor Football Championship

Preliminary round

Quarter-finals

Semi-finals

Final

All-Ireland Minor Football Championship

Semi-finals

Final

Championship statistics

Miscellaneous

 Leitrim win the Connacht Championship for the first time since 1956.

References

1998
All-Ireland Minor Football Championship